Adam Walker (born June 7, 1968) is a former professional American football player who played running back for five seasons for the San Francisco 49ers and Philadelphia Eagles.

References

1968 births
American football running backs
Players of American football from Pittsburgh
Pittsburgh Panthers football players
Ohio Glory players
San Francisco 49ers players
Philadelphia Eagles players
Living people